Chelsea Jane Bredhauer better known by her stage name Chelsea Jane (born 16 December 1992) is an Australian rapper and songwriter from Charleville, Queensland. She is known for having won the 2013 Australasian Performing Right Association (APRA) Hilltop Hoods Initiative.

Biography
Born and bred out west, Chelsea moved to Toowoomba where she boarded at Downlands College for two and half years, before finishing high school at The Scots PGC College in Warwick. She was the first female to be given the award for emerging rap artists, cementing her ability and style as one to watch.

After leaving school she began studying criminology at Bond University on the Gold Coast and it was here that she discovered the enjoyment of writing for the rap scene, with its distinctive chanted rhyming lyrics. Rap battles, a friendly "dissing" of an opponent and entertaining a crowd, a la Muhammad Ali, were Chelsea's way of getting known in the scene, and she has been a guest judge at rap battles in Sydney and Adelaide as well as travelling overseas to the US, Canada and the UK to connect with well-known artists. One of her breakthroughs came when she was visiting her brother Jack on the rodeo circuit in Canada. Hip hop supergroup ATLien Workshop weren't far away in Atlanta, so she flew down to write some verse with them, which was done in 20 minutes and then recorded. She's built on the national and international attention by being announced as the recipient of the 2013 Hilltop Hoods initiative, worth $10,000.
The first female to win this prestige award for emerging rap artists.

She said her father, Charleville identity Kevin "Blue" Bredhauer, was not "hip hop affiliated" but he fully supported everything she did.

Discography

Albums 

 Ascension (2019)

References
6. Interview With Chelsea Jane solovibesmusic.com Retrieved 12 November 2017

External Links 
Twitter

Living people
Australian women rappers
1992 births
Australian women singer-songwriters
Musicians from Queensland
21st-century Australian women singers
People from South West Queensland